The Killers are an American rock band from Las Vegas.

The Killers may also refer to:

Films
 The Killers (1946 film), an adaptation of the Hemingway story starring Burt Lancaster and Ava Gardner
 The Killers (1956 film), a short film adaptation of the Hemingway story directed by Andrei Tarkovsky and others
 The Killers (1964 film), an adaptation of the Hemingway story starring Ronald Reagan, Angie Dickinson and Lee Marvin
 The Killers (1971 film), a feature film starring Salah Zulfikar, Nahed Sherif and directed by Ashraf Fahmy

Short stories
 "The Killers" (Hemingway short story), by Ernest Hemingway (1927)
 "The Killers" (Bukowski short story), by Charles Bukowski (1973)

See also
 Killer (disambiguation)
 Killers (disambiguation)
 The Killer (disambiguation)